New York Restaurant Week, also known as NYC Restaurant Week is an event held twice a year in which participating restaurants in New York City offer prix fixe lunches and dinners. At the finest restaurants, this can be a fraction of the usual prices. 

The event is held in early winter (January/February) and summer (June/July). Since its inception, Restaurant Week has seen an increase in appreciation, followers, and footfalls to such an extent that it has inspired people to create their own version of the event in various cities across the globe.

History
Restaurant Week began as a lunch-only promotional event in 1992 and is considered the first "restaurant week" and the price was the year $19.92. Tim Zagat and Joe Baum are credited for the "first restaurant week". Tim Zagat in a 2010 The Atlantic article said that he did not see or dream of the possibility of using American Express and Coca-Cola as sponsors for future events at the time.

A letter to the editor of the New York Times was published on July 15, 1992, in the letter Emil William Chynn praised the organization of the first "restaurant week" during the Democratic National Convention, in his letter he suggested that it becomes a yearly event that sponsors like Coca-Cola and American Express could help boost the event. 

Restaurant Week celebrated its 25th anniversary in 2017, 
The program continues bi-annually as of 2020.

References

External links
 
[
[Category:Restaurants in New York City|*]]
Culture of New York City
Recurring events established in 1992